Ryther cum Ossendyke is a civil parish  from Tadcaster and  from Selby, North Yorkshire, England. It includes the village of Ryther. The civil parish population at the 2011 census was 241.

History
Ryther-with-Ossendyke is a parish in the wapentake of Barkston Ash historically in Yorkshire but now in the county of North Yorkshire. The parish is situated on the south side of the River Wharfe, which forms part of the parish boundary. It covered 1,074 hectares and contained the township of Lead Hall about six miles to the west, where there is St Mary's Chapel, a chapel of ease of Ryther's parish church, All Saints Church (13th century).

The origin of the village name 'Ryther' is uncertain. Eilert Ekwall, in the Concise Oxford Dictionary of English Place-Names, rejected an earlier derivation from a putative Old English word gytheru ('clearing'); he instead proposed hryther-ea, 'cattle-isle'. However, more modern scholarship has argued that an unrecorded Old English ryðer, derived from  roð 'clearing' with the suffix -er is more likely.

Ozendyke is a hamlet two miles to the west of Ryther, along the B1223 toward Ulleskelf. Historical spellings included: Osmundayk in 1304, Osmundesayk (1323), Osmondak(e) (1438,1450), Ossendak (1491), Hossindike (1535), Os(s)ingdike (1540, 1549), Ossendike (1588, 1595), and Osendyke (1641). The name meant 'Osmund's eik' (oak), later misunderstood as ending in '-dyke'.

Ryther village contains a Methodist chapel (now disused), the Rythre Arms public house, and a village hall. There were formerly at least two pubs or inns. From the 12th to the 16th century the village was the site of Ryther Castle, the principal seat of the ancient de Rhythre/Ryther family, the Lords of Scarcroft who inherited Harewood Castle in about 1400. Several of the de Ryther family have effigies in All Saints Church. The village once had several shops but now has none. Historically, census returns show that many residents were farm labourers or worked in the larger village of Cawood three miles to the south-east.

The estate of Ryther was owned by the Barons Haversham, who bequeathed it to Thomas Corbett (Lincolnshire MP) in the 1830s.

Geography
Approximately equidistant between Tadcaster and Selby, Ryther is a lowland street village on the south bank of the River Wharfe, which is tidal at that point (tides extend up the Wharfe as far as Ulleskelf). Ryther and Ossendyke Ings are within the parish. It has always been vulnerable to the frequent flooding of the rivers Wharfe and Ouse. Most of the parish is arable farmland with a little mixed farming. This part of Yorkshire typically produces barley, wheat, oilseed rape, sugar beet and potatoes; along the river the meadows and embankments are used for grazing sheep and cattle. There is little woodland in the parish.

In the late twentieth century, a number of new houses extended the village southwards along Mill Lane. The church stands on the eastern side of the village on the edge of Ryther Ings, adjacent to Ryther Hall. A stream, the Pailbank Drain, runs north to south through this end of the village, draining via a marshy slough into the Wharfe, separating church and hall from the village and causing the road to divert at right angles away from the river.
 

References

External links

Civil parishes in North Yorkshire
Selby District